South Burlington is a city in Chittenden County, Vermont, United States. Along with neighboring Burlington, it is a principal city of the Burlington metropolitan area. As of the 2020 U.S. census, the population was 20,292. It is home to the headquarters of Ben & Jerry's and the state of Vermont's largest mall, the University Mall.

History
The area of South Burlington was first granted by the Province of New Hampshire as part of Burlington township on June 7, 1763.

The town of Burlington was organized circa 1785. In 1865, the unincorporated village of Burlington was chartered as a city. The remaining area of the town of Burlington was incorporated by charter of the State of Vermont as a separate town with the name South Burlington in the same year, 1865. The town of South Burlington was later incorporated as a city in 1971, becoming the City of South Burlington.

City Center Initiative

The City Center Initiative is a proposal to create a walkable downtown for South Burlington. The city is investing in infrastructure to support gathering spaces, mobility and economic vitality. The over 300-acre area targeted to be developed and redeveloped is zoned for mixed-use including residential, commercial, and cultural spaces. The main components under design or construction by the city are a city hall, senior center and public library, streets and parks. Two main streets, Market Street and Garden Street, will be constructed and/or reconstructed to form the central routes through "City Center". These streets will be outfitted with bicycle and walking facilities, lined with trees, and include stormwater infiltration surfaces. Along these streets will be mixed-use buildings primarily for use by lower-level retail and upper-level residential units. In addition, a 7+ acre plot has been redeveloped as a public park, with walking paths through a forest, a children's discovery area, and natural art landmarks.

Geography
Located in western Chittenden County, South Burlington is bordered by the municipalities of Burlington to the northwest, Winooski and Colchester to the north, Essex to the northeast, Williston to the east, Shelburne to the south, and Shelburne Bay on Lake Champlain to the west. A large portion of Lake Champlain west of Burlington, extending west to the New York state line, is also part of South Burlington. The Winooski River runs along the northern edges of the city on its borders with Winooski, Colchester, and Essex.

Demographics

South Burlington is a principal city of the Burlington, Vermont metropolitan area.

2010 census
As of the census of 2010, the population density was 1,121.2 people per square mile (670.5/km2). There were 8,429 housing units at an average density of 507.8 per square mile (150.8/km2).

2020 census
The 2020 census estimates that there were 19,578 people living in South Burlington. There were 8,764 households and the average number of persons residing in one household was 2.15.

Race and ethnicity as of the 2020 census estimates:

The median income for a household in the city was $73,605.

Employment and income

70.9% of people 16 and older in South Burlington are in the labor force. By sector, the labor force in South Burlington is concentrated in a few main sectors:
34.2% employed in educational services, health care, and social assistance
11.4% employed in manufacturing
9.1%  employed in arts, entertainment, and recreation, and accommodation and food services
9.0% employed in retail
9.0% employed in professional, scientific, and management, and administrative and waste management services

The median household income was $73,605 in 2019 and 25.2% of families have total annual income between $100,000–$150,000. The unemployment rate in 2019 was 4.4%.

Economy
South Burlington has a largely service-based economy. There are 191 businesses in retail trade, mainly concentrated around City Center near Dorset Street and Williston Road. There are 131 establishments in health care and assistance and 116 in professional, scientific, and technical service industries. In 2020, South Burlington was first in the state for gross retail and use sales with $1,385,886,972. Real estate, rental, and leasing operations had a sales value of $86,976,000 in 2012.

Some of the major employers in South Burlington are the Vermont National Guard, GE Healthcare, Ben & Jerry's, Fairpoint Communications, Lane Press, and Halyard Brewing Co. South Burlington is home to CommutAir, a regional airline, and is headquartered in the city by the airport. Other important economic forces in South Burlington include the University Mall, Vermont's largest mall, four grocery stores centrally located in City Center Healthy Living Market & Cafe, Price Chopper, Hannaford, and Trader Joe's, and the Development Plan for City Center.

Parks and recreation
South Burlington is home to a variety of parks that have various walking trails with various amenities for all ages. All parks have parking available. 
Red Rocks Park is a public park and beach on the shores of Lake Champlain.
Farrell Park is a 22 acre park with a playground, picnic area, has access to pedestrian trails and an off-leash dog park. 
Overlook Park is a scenic park overlooking Lake Champlain and the Adirondacks.
Veterans Memorial Park (also known as Dorset Park) is the city's most well-known park. It has three baseball fields, one basketball court, a playground, and Cairns Arena, the high school's hockey arena, is close by.
Jaycee Park has a playground, basketball court, and open space for people to use.
Szymanski Park is located in the South End of the city. It has a basketball court, tennis courts, a playground, picnic area, access to recreational and pedestrian trails. 
Wheeler Nature Park, a park located just south of Veterans Memorial Park, with one hiking trail and scenic views of Mount Mansfield.

Government
The city government is a council–manager form of government with five at-large city council members. Budgets must be approved by voters. The city budget for 2021 was $26,599,754. The city maintains roads, recreation paths and parks, and recreation, planning and zoning, fire and police departments as will as a city clerk's office and city manager's office.  The city clerk is elected by the voters and the city manager is appointed by the city council.  The city also has a sewer (water quality), stormwater, and water utility.

Education

Elementary schools
 Chamberlin School (public)
 Orchard School (public)
 Rick Marcotte Central School (public)
 The Schoolhouse (private, independent)

Middle schools
 Frederick H. Tuttle Middle School (the city's only public middle school)
 Vermont Commons School (private, independent)

High schools
 Rice Memorial High School (private, Roman Catholic)
 South Burlington High School (the city's only public high school)
 Vermont Commons School (private, independent)

Media

Newspapers
 The Other Paper, a weekly newspaper published since 1977. Now owned by the Vermont Community Newspaper Group.

Television
 WCAX-TV
 WPTZ – Although licensed to Plattsburgh, New York, the station relocated their main studio facility to the same building in South Burlington that contains the Ben & Jerry's headquarters in the fall of 2019.

Radio

 WXXX – 95.5 FM (95 Triple X) (Top 40)

Infrastructure

Transportation

Airport

Burlington International Airport provides the area with commercial service to major regional hubs and international airports. Despite its name, it is located in South Burlington, although the land it is located on is owned and operated by the neighboring City of Burlington, Vermont's most populous municipality. It originally did not offer scheduled commercial flights to destinations outside the United States, although it now has a Customs Port of Entry. The name dates to a time when it offered flights to Montreal. From 2011 to 2018, there were seasonal flights to Billy Bishop Airport in Toronto. Bus service is provided by Green Mountain Transit.

The airport is the base of the Vermont Air National Guard and an Army Aviation Support Facility (AASF) of the Vermont Army National Guard. The airport is the muster point for the Air Wing of the Vermont State Guard.

Major highways

  Interstate 89
  Interstate 189
  U.S. Route 2
  U.S. Route 7
  (Vermont Route 116)

Interstate 89, Vermont's longest interstate highway, has two interchanges serving the city. Exit 13 merges with I-189, which ends at Shelburne Road (U.S. Route 7). The second interchange, Exit 14, is the state of Vermont's largest highway exit and merges onto U.S. Route 2. Exit 14E merges onto Williston Road and Dorset Street in South Burlington.  Exit 14W is the main exit into Burlington and becomes Main Street in the Burlington city limits, by the University of Vermont.

Interstate 189 goes east–west, connecting two of the city's main commercial roads, Shelburne Road (U.S. Route 7) and Dorset Street.

 (Vermont Route 116) runs north–south into South Burlington, with the northern terminus being at a junction at U.S. Route 2 (Williston Road).

Notable people

 Kerstin Anderson, stage actress
 Harry Bliss, cartoonist and illustrator
 Ronald Braunstein, conductor
 Jim Condos, Secretary of State of Vermont and former member of the Vermont Senate and South Burlington City Council
 Jason Chin, author of award-winning book Redwoods; resides in South Burlington
 Garry Davis, world citizen, peace activist, founder of the World Service Authority and creator of the World Passport
 John Dooley, former associate justice of the Vermont Supreme Court
 Jack Du Brul, New York Times bestselling author; resides here
 Christian Hansen Jr., U.S. Marshal for Vermont and member of the Vermont House of Representatives
 Benjamin N. Hulburd, former chief justice of the Vermont Supreme Court
 Major Jackson, poet
 Jack Leggett, collegiate baseball coach
 Aaron Miller, retired NHL player and Olympic medalist (one silver and one bronze), resides in South Burlington
 Mike Rochford, pitcher with the Boston Red Sox and Yakult Swallows; was raised and played high school baseball for South Burlington
 Barbara Snelling, former Lieutenant Governor of Vermont, member of the Vermont Senate and First Lady of Vermont
 Martin St. Louis, right wing formerly with the Tampa Bay Lightning, Calgary Flames, and New York Rangers; resides in South Burlington
 Charles Tetzlaff, United States Attorney for the District of Vermont
 Devon Teuscher, principal dancer with the American Ballet Theatre

References

External links

 South Burlington official website
 Lake Champlain Regional Chamber of Commerce

 
Cities in Vermont
Burlington, Vermont metropolitan area
Cities in Chittenden County, Vermont
1763 establishments in New Hampshire
Populated places established in 1763